Middlewich railway station served the Cheshire, England, salt-producing town of Middlewich between 1868 and 1960. It lay on a branch line from Sandbach to Northwich. The Mid Cheshire Rail Users' Association is campaigning for the reopening of the line to passenger traffic, and the construction of a new station at Middlewich.

The station stood on the branch line that was primarily built to serve the industries between Sandbach and Northwich. Most revenue came from the Cheshire salt mines before its transport switched to road haulage. Chemical factories also used the branch with sidings serving the bigger factories. Middlewich station had a sizeable goods depot for freight and parcels office for public use. With the withdrawal of passenger services, the Middlewich branch continues to be used by freight trains and for occasional train diversions.

History

Passengers
The branch line and Middlewich station were built by the London and North Western Railway (LNWR) during 1867–1868.  The railway line was completed in November 1867 and was initially used by goods trains. The station was completed later and was opened for passenger use on 1 July 1868. Provisions had been made for the doubling of the line in the event of sufficient demand, but this option was never exercised. It would be operated by the London Midland & Scottish Railway (LMSR) after the railway grouping of 1 January 1923.

Some trains reversed at Northwich and then continued to Hartford and Greenbank and then along a short stretch of the West Coast Main Line (WCML) to Acton Bridge. In 1885, the LNWR initiated a through carriage on weekdays from Manchester Oxford Road via Northwich to Middlewich and on to London Euston.

For example, in July 1922, there were nine trains a day to Crewe to Northwich, of which five continued to Acton Bridge. There was an additional morning train from and to Crewe that reversed at Middlewich. A departing service from Manchester at 10:30 would pick passengers up at major stations to Northwich, calling at Middlewich at 11:30. The carriage reached Crewe at 11:50, where the steam loco detached and the carriage was attached to a Liverpool to Euston express, reaching the capital at 15:10. The northbound service left Euston at 14:30, reaching Middlewich at 18:10. The services to Euston had ceased by World War II.

By August 1946, the local passenger service had been reduced to six trains each way between Crewe, Middlewich and Northwich, each offering only third class accommodation. The LMSR was nationalised by British Railways on 1 January 1948 and the branch was thereafter operated by the London Midland Region

Halts
Cledford Bridge Halt was located between Sandbach and Middlewich and opened in January 1911. Billinge Green Halt was located between Middlewich and Northwich and opened during 1915. Both halts were closed by the LMSR on 2 March 1942.

Closure

Middlewich station shared in the common experience of a drastic reduction of services during the war and for years after. Passenger numbers were never particularly high, significantly more of the line's revenue was being extracted by its freight traffic instead. By January 1956, the passenger service offered just four third-class only trains each way on weekdays, and none on Sundays. Unlike many other lines services were not increased after 1956. The station became victim of the pre Beeching cuts closure programme, with regular passenger trains ceasing to use the branch on 4 January 1960. Despite this, the station continued to be used by goods traffic until November 1967. The station buildings were subsequently demolished. The nearest railway station is now Winsford 2.3 miles (3.7 km) away on the WCML.

Current status
Freight services regularly use the line through Middlewich to get from the West Coast Main Line at Sandbach (and nearby Crewe) to the Mid-Cheshire line at Northwich. The Crewe and Chester Line is known to flood during severe weather. When this happens, or during engineering work, the line is closed and some Avanti West Coast services from London to Chester and North Wales are diverted through Middlewich instead (Transport for Wales services are replaced by buses and do not use the line). As the section where Middlewich railway station used to be remains dual-track on the otherwise single-track line, diverted Avanti West Coast services are timed for one service to wait at the station's location while another passes or may instead run via Warrington. Due to the line's low speed, travelling from Crewe to Chester via Middlewich takes approximately 1 hour compared to 20 minutes using the Crewe and Chester Line.

As the Crewe and Chester Line is currently Tier 2 priority for being electrified in the CP6 period (2019-2024), it would be likely that Avanti West Coast would introduce electric trains to Chester or further to North Wales if the North Wales Coast Line was also electrified. As part of this, electrifying the Northwich to Sandbach line has been mentioned to allow for the aforementioned diversions to take place without needing diesel locomotives to drag the electric units.

The Mid Cheshire Rail Users' Association is presently campaigning for the reintroduction of passenger services on the Sandbach - Northwich line and the construction of a new station at Middlewich, though not necessarily in the same location as the original. The campaign received a boost in July 2018 when it was announced that the government had requested a strategic outline business plan into the reopening of the line to passenger traffic. The business case is to be handled by Cheshire East Council in conjunction with Cheshire West and Chester Council and the Cheshire and Warrington Local Enterprise Partnership and will look into the cost and benefits of reopening the line and the building of new stations at Middlewich and Gadbrook Park.

In October 2021, £50,000 was made available for a feasibility study into reopening the line.

Route

References

Notes

Bibliography

External links
Middlewich station on the Subterranea Britannica Disused Stations website

Disused railway stations in Cheshire
Middlewich
Former London and North Western Railway stations
Railway stations in Great Britain opened in 1868
Railway stations in Great Britain closed in 1960